In Canada and the United States, a port authority (less commonly a port district) is a governmental or quasi-governmental public authority for a special-purpose district usually formed by a legislative body (or bodies) to operate ports and other transportation infrastructure. In Canada, the federal Minister of Transport selects the local chief executive board member and the rest of the board is appointed at the recommendation of port users to the federal Minister; while all Canadian port authorities have a federal or Crown charter called letters patent.

Numerous Caribbean nations have port authorities, including those of Aruba, British Virgin Islands, Bahamas, Jamaica, Cayman Islands, Trinidad and Tobago, St. Lucia, St. Maarten, St. Vincent and the Grenadines.

Central and South America also have port agencies such as autoridad and consorcio (authority and consortium).

In Mexico, the federal government created sixteen port administrations in 1994–1995 called Administración Portuaria Integral (Integral Port Administration) in Spanish, as result of the Ley de Puertos (Port Law) of 1993. These are organized as variable capital corporations (Sociedad Anónima de Capital Variable), with the intent of creating more private investment in a state owned sector.

Port authorities are usually governed by boards or commissions, which are commonly appointed by governmental chief executives, often from different jurisdictions.

Most port authorities are financially self-supporting. In addition to owning land, setting fees, and sometimes levying taxes, port districts can also operate shipping terminals, airports, railroads, and irrigation facilities.

Port authorities and districts 
The distinction between inland and being marine is occasionally open to discussion.  No distinction is made here between river and Great Lakes ports.

Canada 

The Minister of Transport is ultimately responsible for his patronage of Canadian port authorities, a useful map of which is electronically available at Transport Canada.

Port authorities 
With date of Letters Patent.

Other agencies
 Transport Canada
 St. Lawrence Seaway Management Corporation
 Canada Ports Corporation

Former agency
 National Harbours Board

United States
Charter date in parenthesis.

Mexico 
Listed from northwest to southeast. API stands for Administración Portuaria Integral (Integral Port Administration).

Caribbean
Port Authority of Jamaica, Jamaica
Barbados Port Authority, Barbados
Grand Bahama Port Authority, The Bahamas

Central America
 Autoridad Marítima de Panamá
 Comisión Portuaria Nacional, Guatemala
 Dirección General de Puertos Empresa Nacional Portuaria, Honduras
 JAPDEVA – Atlantic Port Authority, Costa Rica

Middle East
Israel Port Authority
General Organization of Sea Ports, Bahrain
Saudi Ports Authority, Kingdom of Saudi Arabia

Asia Pacific
Bintulu Port Authority
Busan Port Authority
Gwadar Port Authority
Indonesia Port Corporations
Port of Kitakyūshū
Port of Niihama
Port of Shanghai
Port of Singapore
Port Qasim Authority
Sri Lanka Ports Authority
Sydney Harbour Foreshore Authority
Taiwan International Ports Corporation

United Kingdom

In the United Kingdom operators of ports and harbours become de facto port authorities under several pieces of legislation. Examples include the:

Mersey Docks and Harbour Company
Port of London Authority

See also 
 Airport authority
 American Association of Port Authorities
 List of North American ports
 Trust port

References

External links 
 General Organization of Sea Port – Bahrain
 Washington Ports - What is a port district?
 Port of Allyn – Port district FAQ
 International Association of Ports and Harbors
 American Association of Port Authorities